Chromio, known before 1927 as Sfiltsi (Σφίλτσι), is a community located in Aiani municipal unit, Kozani regional unit, in the Greek region of Macedonia. It is situated at an altitude of 640 meters above sea level. The postal code is 50004, while the telephone code is +30 24610. At the 2011 census, the population was 92. 

The Monastery of Agia Trias Larious is in Chromio.

References

External links
 Village Chromio 

Populated places in Kozani (regional unit)